Patrick Rey (born 15 March 1959) is a French former professional footballer who played as a left winger. In his career, he notably played for Lille, Montpellier, Angers, Grenoble, and Gueugnon in the Division 1 and Division 2.

Early life 
Rey was born in Tlemcen in French Algeria. Originally from Chalon-sur-Saône, he signed for his hometown club of FC Chalon in 1967. Rey's father worked at the town's police station. Patrick recalls spending a lot of time at the Stade Léo Lagrange as a child. According to himself, all he could think about at this age was playing football. Roger Rey, the stadium's former groundskeeper, took Patrick under his wing. According to Patrick, Roger was like his "second father" and FC Chalon was like his "second family".

Career 
Due to scoring many goals at all youth levels, Rey made his debut for Chalon's first team in the Division d'Honneur at the age of sixteen. In 1976, he joined INF Vichy, where he would spend the next three years of his career. At INF Vichy, Rey won the Coupe Gambardella in 1978 and the Division 3 in 1979.

In 1979, following his graduation from INF Vichy, Rey joined Division 1 side Lille. Although he was loaned out to Montpellier for a season, he would go on to play several matches for Lille, including some as a starter. He was notably the architect of a 5–4 victory over Paris Saint-Germain in the 1983–84 season, scoring two goals and assisting the game-winning goal of Bernard Bureau. In 1984, Rey joined Division 2 side Angers. He played one season at the club before joining Grenoble in 1985. In 1986, Rey signed for Gueugnon, which would turn out to be the last club of his professional career.

Rey retired from professional football in 1987. However, he would continue playing at an amateur level in Southern France for several years. He played for US Mandelieu and Antibes before hanging up the boots at Biot. At Mandelieu, where he played alongside Robert Sab, Rey reached the round of 64 of the Coupe de France in the 1990–91 edition, losing 6–0 to Saint-Étienne.

Personal life 
Rey has stated that Lille is his favorite club. He has been invited to friendly matches played between former players of the club. After his football career, Rey became a wealth management advisor for a private firm in Valbonne.

Honours 
INF Vichy

 Division 3: 1978–79
 Coupe Gambardella: 1977–78

References 

1959 births
Living people
People from Tlemcen
People from Chalon-sur-Saône
French footballers
Pieds-Noirs
Algerian footballers
Algerian people of French descent
Association football wingers
FC Chalon players
INF Vichy players
Lille OSC players
Montpellier HSC players
Angers SCO players
Grenoble Foot 38 players
FC Gueugnon players
Division d'Honneur players
French Division 3 (1971–1993) players
Ligue 1 players
Ligue 2 players
Sportspeople from Saône-et-Loire
Footballers from Bourgogne-Franche-Comté